The Boston Medical Library (est. 1875) of Boston, Massachusetts, was originally organized to alleviate the problem that had emerged due to the scattered distribution of medical texts throughout the city. It has evolved into the "largest academic medical library in the world".

Early history
In 1875, the Society for Medical Observation, the Society for Medical Improvement, the Treadwell Library at the Massachusetts General Hospital, and the Public Library all had volumes of information that needed to be more accessible to physicians.  This was the second attempt to create a medical library in the city; the first attempt was in 1805.  This second library was incorporated with the first "as an independent institution under the control of the profession as a whole".  James Read Chadwick, a gynecologist, collected books, pamphlets, and medical periodicals and make this material accessible to the practicing physician.  It later became the later the Boston Medical Library (BML).  Oliver Wendell Holmes Sr., Parkman Professor of Anatomy and Physiology at Harvard, served as the BML's first president and writer Librarian.

The Francis A. Countway Library of Medicine
In 1960, the BML and the Harvard Medical Library combined their collections. It was housed in a new building named for Lever Brothers executive Francis A. Countway, whose sister, after his death, gave $3.5 million of his fortune toward the library.

Current developments
In 1999, the Rare Books and Special Collections Department of the Countway Library assumed custodial responsibility for the Warren Anatomical Museum. Among its holdings is the skull of Phineas Gage, whose life after a traumatic brain injury contributed significantly to medical science.

The department was renamed the Center for the History of Medicine in 2004. It hosts rotating exhibits about the history of medicine from the library collections. The displays are located in the lobby area and are open to the public. , however, exhibits are closed while the Library undergoes a renovation; the building is slated to reopen in 2021.

According to the History of Medicine Division of the National Institutes of Health's National Library of Medicine, The Francis A. Countway Library of Medicine is the "largest academic medical library in the world, and its collections, which have been formed over nearly two centuries, sometimes through the medical holdings of other libraries, include rare and historical materials that can be numbered among the largest in the world." The New England Journal of Medicine noted that The Francis A. Countway Library of Medicine loaned out material from the 19th century in order to make the 2010 electronic-conversion possible, as paper copies of some issues of the Journal were found missing from their own archive.

Collections
Boston Medical Library includes the following collections:
National Archives of Plastic Surgery, established in 1972 by Robert Goldwyn
History of medicine (802 incunabula)
European books printed 16th–20th centuries
English books published 1475–20th century, American books 18th–20th centuries, Bostoniana
Medical Hebraica and Judaica, 14th–20th centuries
Manuscripts and archives, especially of New England origin (20 million items)
Medical library of Oliver Wendell Holmes, Sr. (900 titles)
Warren Library of early works in surgery (2,000 volumes)
Friedrich Tiedemann collection of anatomy and physiology (4,000 items)
Historical collection in radiology
Medical prints, photographs and artwork (35,000)
Storer Collection of medical medals (6,000)

See also
 Boston Medical Library (1805–1826)

References

Further reading

External links
 Countway Library of Medicine
 
 

1875 establishments in Massachusetts
Libraries in Mission Hill, Boston
Medical libraries
University and college academic libraries in the United States
Harvard Library
Harvard Medical School
Libraries established in 1875